Fariha Razzaq Haroon was a Pakistani politician and journalist who was a member of the Provincial Assembly of Sindh from 2002 to 2007. Born in 1956, she became the first Pakistani writer to be recognised by The International Federation of Journalists for this coveted feat. Her written article also earned her and Pakistan for the first time the prized European Commission's "Lorenzo Natali Prize for Journalism" in 2000. She became the first Pakistani writer to be recognised by The International Federation of Journalists.

Early life and education
She was the daughter of an eminent civil engineer Abdul Razaq, who worked as a Chief Engineering Advisor to the Saudi Royal Air Force, after retirement as an Engineer in Chief Directorate of the Pakistan Army. He later went on to serve in politics and assisted Benazir Bhutto during her tenure as a Prime Minister. Fariha's mother Nishat Afza was a poet and an eminent social worker, graduated from Punjab University. During her time in the Punjab Assembly, she moved many private bills and motions for human rights and for the underprivileged. She hailed from Toba Tek Singh where her family was operating a radio station since 2007.

Fariha completed her schooling from Convent of Jesus and Mary, Murree, as a high performing student she excelled in studies as well as sports. She was captain of the volleyball team and was also presented with a lifetime achievement award by the school for being an outstanding student and in recognition of her accomplishments.

She studied Communications & Journalism Innovation at Stanford University, USA as well as English Literature and French from Kinnaird College Lahore, Pakistan.

She also earned a fellowship in Social Justice & Democracy, at University College London, UK and was an alumnus of the National Defence University, Islamabad.

She earned a bachelor of arts degree.

She was a journalist who remained Director Public Relations with the Jang Group of Newspapers.

Razzaq married Hazar Khan Bijarani in 2008.

Her illustrious career as a writer won her various accolades as an eloquent journalist and human rights activist. She wrote over 1,000 articles over a span of 30 years for national and international publications.

Political career
She was nominated as Pakistan Peoples Party’s candidate for the reserved seats for women. She was elected to the assembly in 2002, Provincial Assembly of Sindh as a candidate for a reserved seat for women in 2002 Pakistani general election.

As a member of the assembly, she took up significant social and human rights causes to support; specifically, Karo Kari, domestic violence, runaway marriages, child labour, women’s rights and forced labour.

She was involved with multiple NGOs including Human Rights Commission of Pakistan to support various significant causes. She held workshops and regularly toured the interior parts of the country to create awareness on transitional justice, conflict prevention, family planning, education, human rights and peace building.

Awards & Acknowledgments

She was honoured with the prestigious "Annual Muslim Award" by the House of Lords in 2003. This prestigious award is bestowed on behalf of the Queen of the United Kingdom.

She also received by the Prime Minister of Pakistan "Madar-i-Millat Award" in 2003 for her selfless dedication to improve the status of the underprivileged in society.

In 2007, she was awarded "Service to the Nation Award".
She was recognised by the Pakistan British Trust on Pakistan’s 60th year for the Power 100 list of Pakistani people, who have accomplished the very highest levels of achievement.

Highest National Award
On Independence Day, 14 August 2019, President of Pakistan approved the conferment of Pakistan Civil Award Tamgha-i-Imtiaz for her outstanding services to the State of Pakistan.
This recognition is based on her work and services over the last 3 decades for highlighting human and especially women’s rights in Pakistan.

Death
On 1 February 2018, Fariha Razzaq Haroon was found dead in her home in Karachi along with her husband Hazar Khan Bijarani. Family and PPP have confirmed that the couple suffered gunshot wounds. Police said the death appeared to be a murder-suicide.

References

1956 births
2018 deaths
Sindh MPAs 2002–2007
21st-century Pakistani women politicians
Pakistani women journalists
21st-century journalists
Pakistan People's Party politicians
People murdered in Pakistan
Pakistani murder victims
Deaths by firearm in Pakistan
Murder–suicides in Pakistan
People from Toba Tek Singh District